In the history of rock climbing, the three main sub-disciplines—bouldering, single-pitch climbing, and big wall (and multi-pitch) climbing—can trace their origins to late 19th-century Europe.  Bouldering started in Fontainebleau, and was advanced by Pierre Allain in the 1930s, and John Gill in the 1950s.  Big wall climbing started in the Dolomites, and was spread across the Alps in the 1930s by climbers such as Emilio Comici and Riccardo Cassin, and in the 1950s by Walter Bonatti, before reaching Yosemite where it was led in the 1950s to 1970s by climbers such as Royal Robbins.  Single-pitch climbing started pre-1900 in both the Lake District and in Saxony, and by the 1970s had spread widely with climbers such as Ron Fawcett (Britain), Bernd Arnold (Germany), Patrick Berhault (France), Ron Kauk and John Bachar (USA).

As a free solo exercise with no artificial aid or climbing protection, bouldering remained largely consistent since its origins. Single-pitch climbing stopped using artificial aid in the early 20th-century, led by Paul Preuss, and later by Kurt Albert, in so-called "free climbing", however, it would not be until the late 1960s and early 1970s that Robbins and Yvon Chouinard would bring free climbing to big wall climbing.  Climbing protection was needed for single-pitch and big-wall free climbing, and was inserted into the route while climbing; this is called "traditional climbing". By the 1980s, French pioneers like Patrick Edlinger wanted to climb rock faces in Buoux and Verdon that had no cracks in which to insert traditional climbing protection.  They pre-drilled bolts into routes for protection (but not as artificial aid); this became known as "sport climbing". It led to a dramatic increase in climbing standards, grades, and tools (e.g. artificial climbing walls and campus boards), the development of competition climbing (initially dominated in the 1990s by French climbers such as François Legrand), and the "professional" rock climber.

By the end of the 20th-century, the hardest sport climbs were often combinations of bouldering-moves, and some of the best challenges lay in free climbing extreme big walls; this led to greater cross-over amongst the three sub-disciplines.  Leading climbers such as Wolfgang Güllich, Jerry Moffatt, Alexander Huber, Fred Nicole, Chris Sharma, Adam Ondra, and Tommy Caldwell set records in several of these disciplines.  Güllich and Huber also made ever-bolder single-pitch free solo climbs, while Sharma pushed standards in deep-water soloing; Alex Honnold's big wall free soloing was turned into the Oscar-winning film, Free Solo.  In 2016, the IOC announced that competition climbing would be a medal sport in the 2020 Summer Olympics.

Female rock climbing developed later in the 20th-century but by the 1970s and 1980s, climbers such as Lynn Hill and Catherine Destivelle were closing the gap to the standard of routes being climbed by the leading men.  In 1993, Hill made the first free ascent of The Nose on El Capitan, one of the most sought-after big wall climbing prizes that had resisted all prior attempts.  By the 21st-century, Josune Bereziartu, Angela Eiter and Ashima Shiraishi, had closed the gap to the highest sport and boulder climbing grades achieved by men to within one/two notches; Beth Rodden fully closed the gap for traditional climbing grades by freeing Meltdown, and Janja Garnbret became the most successful competition climber in history with 31 IFSC world cup golds.

Origins

There are early documented examples of people "rock climbing" to achieve various objectives. The  records that in 1492, ordered by his king, Antoine de Ville used castle siege tactics to ascend Mont Aiguille, a 300-meter rock tower, near Grenoble, France. In 1695, Martin Martin described the traditional practice of fowling by climbing with the use of ropes in the Hebrides of Scotland, especially on St Kilda.

The first ascent of Mont Blanc in 1786, started mountaineering's "modern era"; however it would take another century until the fixed anchors of rock climbing appeared, including pitons, bolts, and rappel slings. By the early 19th-century, "alpine rock climbing" was developing as a pastime; the tools of the alpine shepherd guides (early mountain guides), the alpenstock and woodcutter's axe (later combined as the ice axe).

Although the action of rock climbing had become a component of 19th-century victorian era Alpine mountaineering, a sport of rock climbing (i.e. climbing short rock routes as a recreational activity without any summit objective), originated in the last quarter of the 19th-century, and in four European locations: the Saxon Switzerland climbing region in Germany, the Lake District and Peak District in England, the Dolomites in Italy, and in the forest of Fontainebleau in France.

 The solo first ascent of Napes Needle in the Lake District, England, by Walter Parry Haskett Smith in June 1886 is widely considered to be the start of the sport of rock climbing. In 1897, O. G. Jones climbed Kern Knotts Crack at grade VS. By the early 20th-century, groups of 60 would gather at the Wastwater Hotel in the Lake District during vacations.
By the 1930s, there were 200 climbing clubs in the area.
 The 1887 solo first ascent of the Vajolet Towers by the 17-year-old Munich high school student Georg Winkler, encouraged the acceptance and development of the sport in the Dolomites, and in particular opened up the era of big wall climbing on the huge rock faces of the Dolomites, which spread over the wider Alps including the important centre of Chamonix in France.
 By 1897, members of the French Club alpin français began to gather amongst the boulders of Fontainebleau to practice their rock climbing skills that they would use in the Alpine season; the boulders were shorter than the large walls being attempted in the Lake District, Saxon Switzerland or the Dolomites, but this led to the development of more advanced bouldering skills.

19th century

1848: , a local chimney sweep, enters the hill-top Königstein Fortress by climbing a chimney in the sandstone plateau to avoid the entrance fee; this is now considered the first free climb in the Saxon Switzerland climbing region, and is today a climbing route called Abratzkykamin IV (ca 5.4).
1857: John Ball, future president of the British Alpine Club, makes an early first ascent of Monte Pelmo, in the Dolomites.
1859–1869: Paul Grohmann makes numerous first ascents of rocky spires in the Dolomites, such as Tofana di Mezzo, Sorapiss, Cristallo and Langkofel.
1864: Gustav Tröger, Ernst Fischer, J. Wähnert and H. Frenzel, aid climb Turnerweg on Falkenstein, formally starting the sport in Saxon Switzerland.
1869 : John Muir, the naturalist and climber, makes an onsight free solo of Cathedral Peak in Tuolumne Meadows, Yosemite.
1874: Otto Ewald Ufer and H. Frick make the first-ever first free ascent (no aid) of Mönch, in the Saxon Switzerland climbing region.
1875 : George Anderson climbs Half Dome in Yosemite, using drilled eye bolts for holds, and a fixed rope to return to his high point each day.
1876: Donald McDonald, a crofter from the Isle of Lewis climbs Handa, the first recorded climb for leisure in Britain.
1876:  invents the basic body rappel in the French Alps; its most useful form, the dülfersitz, is invented in 1910 by Hans Dülfer.

1881: Benedikt Venetz leads Albert Mummery and Alex Burgener on the first ascent of the Aiguille du Grépon, Chamonix, 10-pitches, and the famous 40-foot Fissure Mummery  "Mummery Crack", the 5.6 crux, is maybe first-ever grade HS 4b.
1886 : June, W. P. Haskett Smith free soloed the 70-foot Napes Needle (V Diff), in the Lake District of England; this is considered the "birth" of the sport.
1887 : Georg Winkler, aged 17, free soloed the Vajolet Towers (5.5, 7-pitches), initiating the sport in the Dolomites, and the use of hemp-soled sailor's boots.
1892 : Oscar Eckenstein, early bouldering advocate, runs a competition, with cash prizes, among the natives while on an expedition to the Karakoram Mountains.
1892:  Steel carabiners appear in the Saxon Switzerland climbing region; they can hold static body weight but are not reliably strong for dynamic leader falls.
1893: Lily Bristow is the first-ever female to summit the difficult Aiguille du Grepon, in Chamonix, France.
1893 : Devils Tower is aid climbed by ranchers William Rogers and Willard Ripley; after 6 weeks they summit on the Fourth of July.
1897: O. G. Jones leads, after top rope, Kern Knotts Crack at VS 4c on the Great Gable in England; potentially the first .

1900s

1900: (approximately) : Oscar Eckenstein demonstrates the concept of modern balance climbing on his eponymous bouldering route in Llanberis Pass, Wales.
1900 :  free soloed onsight Piaz Route on Punta Emma, Catinaccio, in the Dolomites, Italy, at 5.7 (7-pitches).
1900 : Heinrich Pfannel, Thomas Maischberger, and Franz Zimmer do the first-ever alpine first free ascent on the Southwest Face of Dent du Géant, in Chamonix, France, bypassing all spikes, ropes, and ladders.
1901 : Michele Bettaga, Beatrice Tomasson, Artolo Zagonel make the first ascent of the South Face of Marmolada, Dolomites, Italy in a day; first big wall climb (5.5, using 4 pitons for anchors on 24-pitches).
1906 : Oliver Perry-Smith, W. Hünig, Rudolf Fehrmann climb Perrykante on Teufelsturm, in the Saxon Switzerland climbing region; 90-feet, Sax VIIb; world's first-ever grade  route.
1908 : , J. Klammer, R. Schietzold, F Schroffenegger, make the first ascent of the West Face of Totenkirchl, Austria, UIAA Grade V (5.7 with a tension traverse) 19 pitches.
1909 : (approximately) Felt-soled rock climbing shoes are introduced.

1910s

1910 :  replaces the attached ring on pitons with an eye in the body of the piton, a design still used to this day.
1910 :  designs and utilizes a stronger, user-friendly, steel carabiner, specifically made for tension traverses with modern pitons.
1910 : , Oliver Perry-Smith, and H. Wagner ascend the Großer Falknerturm on Matthäusriß, in the Saxon Switzerland climbing region, Sax VIIb, maybe the first .
1910 :  leads Südriss on Kreuzturm, in the Saxon Switzerland climbing region, Sax VIIc, and hardest short climb for a decade, the first-ever .
1910 : Franz Schroffenegger and Franz Wenter climb the 450-metre Northwest Face of Delago Tower, and the 500-metre North Face of Croda di Re Laurino, in the Dolomites. UIAA Grade VI- (5.9-).
1911 : Paul Preuss free soloed the first ascent of the 900-foot East Face of Campanile Basso, in the Italian Dolomites,  on friable rock.
1911 : September, Paul Preuss, starts the Mauerhakenstreit (piton dispute) and advocates for a transition to free climbing; in a series of essays and articles in the German Alpine Journal, he defines "artificial aid" and proposes 6 rules of free climbing including the important rule 4: "The piton is an emergency aid and not the basis of a system of mountaineering".
1912 : Angelo Dibona, Luigi Rizzi, and brothers Guido and Max Mayer, climb the South Face of the Meije, in the Massif des Écrins, France.
1913 : Hans Dülfer free soloed, onsight, the 250-metre Dülferriss on the Fleischbank, in Austria, at UIAA VI- (5.9-) (6-pitches).
1913 : Hans Dülfer and Willi von Redwitz, climb the 700-metre West Face Direct, on Totenkirchl, in Austria, at UIAA V+ (5.8 X), in 8 hours (23-pitches, longest rock climb to date).
1913 : Hans Dülfer, with only 3 pitons, leads the West Face Cima Grande, in the Dolomites, at 5.8 X (8-pitches); he invents a 5-step grading system, the rope tension traverse, and dülfersitz rappelling.
1913 : Rudolf Fehrmann publishes the second edition of Der Bergsteiger in der Sächsischen Schweiz (The Climber in Saxon Switzerland), which includes the first binding rules for climbing in the area to protect the soft sandstone rock. These include that only natural holds of the rock are allowed for climbing. These rules for free climbing are still in use and haven't changed significantly.
1914 : Siegfried Herford and companions, climb, using shoulder stands, the Flake Pitch on the Central Buttress of Scafell (5.8 A0, 5.9 today), Britain's hardest climb at the time (3-pitches).
1916 : Ivar Berg free soloed the 60-foot Cave Arête Indirect at Laddow Rocks, Derbyshire, England,  at E1 5a (5.9+), it was the first E1.
1918 :  climbs, unprotected, Westkante at the Wilder Kopf, in the Saxon Switzerland climbing region, at Sax VIIIa, the world's first-ever , (2-pitches).

1920s

1920s–1930s : Robert L. M. Underhill and Miriam Underhill (Miriam E. O'Brien), Early climbing couples; Robert introduced European climbing techniques in an article in the 1931 Bulletin of the Sierra Club.
1921 : Oswald Kunis leads the unprotected Kuniskante on Rauschentorwächter, in the Saxon Switzerland climbing region. Sax VIIIa/VIIIb, the world's first-ever .
1922 : Hans Rost leads, with 2 protection rings, the run-out on Rostkante, on Hauptwiesenstein, in the Saxon Switzerland climbing region. Sax VIIIb, the world's first-ever .
1923 : , adding to Dülfer's five grades, creates the Roman Numeral European rating system for rock climbs (Grades I to VI); this system eventually became UIAA grading.
1924 : Felix Simon and Roland Rossi climb the 850-metre North Face of Monte Pelmo, in the Dolomites, Italy, at UIAA V+, placing 11 pitons.
1925 : July 28, Fritz Wiessner, Roland Rossi climb Southeast Face of Fleischbank, Austria, at VI+/5.10a, 11-pitches with 4 free pitches at Grade VI, a tension traverse pitch, and an aid pitch over a roof.
1925 : August 1,  and Fritz Wiessner climb the 750-metre North Face of Furchetta, Dolomites, a 20-pitch route and two pitches of UIAA VI (5.9) near the top.
1925 : August 7, Gustav Lettenbauer and  climb the 1,200-metre NW Face of Civetta, Dolomites in a day, UIAA VI- (5.9), 44-pitches, 15 pitons; world's hardest big wall climb.
1925 : Albert Ellingwood and a party of three climb the 2,000-foot Northeast Buttress (or the Ellingwood Ledges) on the Crestone Needle (14,197 feet), in Colorado, USA, at grade .
1927 :  designs and sells the first rock drill and climbing expansion bolt.
1927 : Joe Stettner and brother, Paul, apply European techniques in the USA on their ascent of the 9-pitch Stettner Ledges (5.7) on the East Face of Long's Peak.
1927 : Fred Pigott experiments with slinging natural chockstones, and later machine nuts, for protection at Clogwyn Du'r Arddu on Snowdon, and led to the modern climbing nut.
1929 : , Demitrio Christomannos, Roberto Perathoner make, in 2 days and placing only 6 pitons, the first ascent of the South Pillar of Marmolada, 5.9+, 600-meters, Dolomites.
1929 : Miriam Underhill and Alice Damesme make the first "manless" ascent of the Aiguille du Grépon, in Chamonix, France.

1930s

1930 : Jack Longland leads, onsight, Javelin Blade at Hollytree Wall, Idwal, at E1 5b (5.10a X) with forty-foot runout at the crux.
1931 : Emilio Comici invents the aid ladder, solid belay anchors, taglining, and hanging bivouacs; tools that changed big wall climbing. He used them all on his 3-day, 57-pitch, 1500-metre climb of the Northwest Face of the Civetta, in the Dolomites, mostly free (5.9+ with 3 aid sections, only 35 pitons).
1931 : Robert Underhill leads the first ascent of the North Ridge of Grand Teton, WY. About 1,500 ft.  (5.7)
1932 :  and Giuani Rifesser climb Furchetta North Face route, Dolomites, adding a dangerous, 5-pitch direct finish, UIAA VII- (5.10b/c X), only 5 new protection pitons.
1933 : Emilio Comici, Giuseppi Dimai and Angelo Dimai climb, in 3 days, the 1,700-foot North Face Dimai Route of Cima Grande, in the  Dolomites, at 5.9 and 3 aid pitches; becomes the world's most overhanging big wall climbing route.
1934 : Pierre Allain champions bouldering at Fontainebleau; climbs L'Angle Allain, .
1934 : Dick Leonard, Jules Eichorn and Bestor Robinson made the first ascent of the Eichorn Pinnacle, at Cathedral Peak in the Sierra Nevada.
1934 : , Bartolo Sandri climb, in 2 days, the 750-metre South Face of Torre Trieste, Dolomites, UIAA VIII-, maybe the world's first-ever  but it's not clear if the crux was done totally free (35-pitches).
1935 : Riccardo Cassin,  climb the 700-metre North Face of Cima Ovest, in the Dolomites, takes 3 days and 60 pitons, 5.9 and 3 aid sections. Most committing big wall climbing to date.
1935 : Fritz Wiessner and Roger Whitney, using only 1 protection piton, climb Vector, on Ragged Mountain, Connecticut, rated 5.8+ R, likely 5.9, the hardest pitch in the US for a decade.
1935 : Pierre Allain, added a rubber band to a tennis shoe as a climbing shoe; later, in 1947, with Edmond Bourdonneau (EB), he markets a stiffer, flat-soled edging shoe, the "PA".
1936 :  and Ettore Castiglioni free climb, in two days, a 29-pitch route on the Marmolada, Dolomites, UIAA VII- (5.10c). Hardest long, totally-free climb in the world.
1937 :  develops and sells the first leather boots with "lug-soled rubber" (called tank-tread) for rock climbing, mountaineering, and hiking; called "Vibram soles". 
1937 : Emilio Comici re-climbs the North Face Dimai Route route on the Cima Grande alone, with some gear but no rope, mostly free-solo (5.9), but pulling on some pitons, in three and a half hours.
1938 : Riccardo Cassin, Gino Esposito, Ugo Tizzoni ascend, in 3 days, the classic, alpine, 3,500-foot Walker Spur of the Grandes Jorasses "...perhaps the finest in existence" Gaston Rébuffat.
1939 : David Brower and the rest of his Berkeley crew use four bolts in the process of ascending Ship Rock in New Mexico.

1940s

1940s : World War II leads to the development of inexpensive, army-surplus pitons, carabiners and the newly invented nylon rope, making leader falls significantly safer.
1945 : Chris Preston, after a top rope, leads, with no protection, the two pitches of Suicide Wall, in Ogwen, Wales, at E2 5c (5.10c X).
1946 :  and Sepp Spiegl create an 8-pitch route on Fleischbank, Austria, UIAA VII (5.10d) with four hard pitches: VII, VII-, VI, VI-.
1946 :  solves Marie-Rose, in Fontainebleau, France, considered one of the first-ever  boulder problems. 
1947 : Pierre Allain, in France, and Raffi Bedayn, in the US, market lightweight, aluminum carabiners for climbing, significantly reducing the weight carried by climbers.
1949 : Harold Goodro leads Goodro's Wall, 5.10c, Big Cottonwood Canyon, UT, 80 feet.  Hardest short climb in the USA.
1949 : Peter Harding leads, after a top rope, the traditional climbing route Demon Rib, at Black Rocks, in the UK, at E3 5c is one of the world's first-ever  routes.

1950s

1950 : John Salathe and Allen Steck climb Steck-Salathe on Sentinel Rock, Yosemite, 5.8 A3, in a 5-day push. 16 pitches. Yosemite's longest wall climb.
1952 : Lionel Terray, Guido Magnone make the first ascent of Mount Fitzroy (11,020 feet), Patagonia, 16 pitches of Alpine rock climbing, 5.9 with some aid.
1952 : Bonnie Prudden leads the first ascent of Bonnie's Roof, (5.8, A0) Shawangunks, NY. 2 pitches.
1952 : John Streetly leads, onsight, the first free ascent of Bloody Slab, at E3 5b (5.10a X), in Llanberis Pass, in Wales
1952 : Chuck Wilts publishes A Climber's Guide to Tahquitz Rock starting the Yosemite Decimal System, where climbs are rated from 5.0 to 5.9.
1952 : Cesare Maestri makes the first free solo of the 44-pitch Solleder Route on Monte Civetta, in the Dolomites, at grade UIAA VI- (5.9-).
1952 : Hermann Buhl, free soloed the first free ascent of Piz Badile on the 8th ascent, UIAA VI+ (5.10a), 21 pitches in 5 hours.
1953 :  solves Le Joker, in Fontainebleau, France, considered one of the first-ever  boulder problems. 
1953 :  invents the "kernmantle rope" with an abrasion-protective outer sheath, making nylon ropes even safer.
1954 : Joe Brown and Don Whillans climb the West Face of Aiguille de Blaitiere, 15 pitches including the famous Fissure Brown (5.10b R), in the Alps.
1955 : Walter Bonatti did one of the greatest big wall climbs in history with a solo, single-push, first ascent of a new route on the Southwest Pillar of the Dru over six days.
1957 :  and  lead the 3,000-foot Philipp-Flamm on Monte Civetta, in the Dolomites. Longest Alpine free climb at UIAA VI+ (5.10 R).
1957 : Royal Robbins, Jerry Gallwas, Mike Sherrick climb the NW Face of Half Dome, Yosemite, in 5 days. 25-pitches, 5.7 A3, 275 pitons and 20 direct aid bolts.  Birth of modern US big wall climbing; historians split the climbing history of Yosemite into: "before and after Half Dome".
1958 : John Gill solves Gill Right Problem, in the Teton Range, in Wyoming, the first-ever  boulder problem; introduces gymnastic "chalk" to climbing.
1958 : Warren Harding and team aid climb the 3,000-foot Nose of El Capitan using siege tactics (600 pitons and 125 bolts) over 45 days at grade 5.8/A3; climb gets worldwide recognition but is highly controversial amongst climbers for its excessive use of aid climbing techniques. 
1958 : Don Whillans free soloed Goliath, at Burbage, in England, at E4 6a is considered one of the world's first-ever  or  routes.
1959 : John Gill solves Red Cross Overhang (or Gill Problem), in the Teton Range, in Wyoming, the first-ever  boulder problem.

1960s

1960 : Dave Rearick and Bob Kamps make the first ascent of Diamond (5.8 A3), Longs Peak, CO, a 10-pitch, Alpine, Big Wall climb all above 13,000 feet of altitude.
1961 : Royal Robbins, Chuck Pratt, and Tom Frost, lead Salathe Wall on El Capitan in 6-days (484 pitons, 13 bolts); 5.9 A4. Single push by Robbins & Frost in 1962. 
1961 : John Gill makes the first free ascent as an onsight, free solo, of the Thimble, in the Needles, South Dakota, USA, now considered the first-ever .
1962 :  free soloed the 57-pitch Comici Route on the Monte Civetta, Dolomites, Italy, as grade UIAA VI+.
1964 : Royal Robbins and Pat Ament free climb Athlete's Feat, Boulder CO. Five very short, hard pitches (5.11a. 5.10d, 5.10d, 5.10c, 5.9). Most difficult multi-pitch in USA.
1964 : Royal Robbins, Chuck Pratt, Tom Frost, and Yvon Chouinard climb the 28-pitch North American Wall on El Capitan, Yosemite, at 5.8/A5, was hardest aid climb.
1964 : Dan Robinson builds the first climbing wall at Leeds University; after training two years on the wall, John Syrett onsights, in 1970, one of Britain's hardest routes, Wall of Horrors (E3 6a).
1965 : Europe's tallest rock face, Norway's 4,000-foot Troll Wall, is aid climbed by Norwegian and British teams who summit a day apart; the wall is rarely repeated. 
1965 : Yvon Chouinard, T M Herbert ascend, in a single push, the 32-pitch Muir Wall on El Cap, 5.9 A5. First new El Cap route by a party of two.
1965 : Chuck Pratt and Chris Fredericks climb the classic, 2-pitch, off-width Twilight Zone in Yosemite, 5.10d X.
1967 : July, Greg Lowe and Jeff Lowe lead the first free ascent of traditional climbing route Macabre Roof, in Ogden, possibly first-ever  (pre Super Crack in 1974).
1967 : October, John Stannard leads the first free ascent of traditional climbing route Foops, in the Shawangunks, one of the first-ever  routes.
1968 : Royal Robbins solos on aid (added aid bolt at crux) the Muir Wall on El Capitan, Yosemite, first time El Capitan is climbed alone (took nine days).
1968 : Tom Proctor leads the traditional climbing route Our Father (E4 6b), at Stoney Middleton, England, one of the highest-grade traditional routes at the time.
1968 : Reinhold Messner onsighted the crux 4-metre Messner Slab of the longer, 7-pitch, Central Pillar route of Heiligkreuzkofel, Italy; it is now considered the first-ever  in the Alps.

1970s

1970 : Warren Harding and Dean Caldwell aid climb Wall of Early Morning Light (Dawn Wall), on El Capitan, 27 days on the 28-pitches at 5.8/A5.
1972 : The 1972 Chouinard Equipment Catalog includes influential articles on "clean climbing" by Yvon Chouinard, Tom Frost, and Doug Robinson. 
1973 : May, John Long leads the traditional climbing route Paisano Overhang, at Suicide Rock, California, considered one of the  first-ever  (the 1967 Macabre Roof is also a possible first-ever 7b+).
1973 : June, Diana Hunter leads, on sight, Wide Country, Eldorado Springs.CO, the first-ever 6c (5.11a/b) by a woman.
1973 : October, Beverly Johnson, Sibylle Hechtel, first female team to ascend El Capitan via Triple Direct; Hechtel called it "Walls without Balls".
1973 : November, John Bragg leads the traditional climbing route Kansas City, in the Shawangunks, USA, first-ever  (John Gosling's English Hanging Gardens also considered a possible first-ever 7b).
1974 : Steve Wunsch leads the traditional climbing route Super Crack, in the Shawangunks, USA, considered one of the  first-ever .
1975 : Jim Holloway solves Trice, in Boulder, Colorado, considered the first-ever  boulder problem (with Holloway's 1977 Slapshot).
1975 : Steve Wunsch leads the bolt-protected roof on the traditional climbing route Psycho Roof, in Eldorado Canyon State Park, USA, considered the first-ever .
1975 : Charlie Porter aid solos the remote big wall, Northwest Face Mount Asgard, Baffin Island, 40 pitches, 5.10 A4. Alone for 9 days climbing; committing Big Wall climb.
1975 : Ron Kauk, John Bachar, John Long, lead-free (following on aid) all 12 pitches of  Astroman, (5.11c) Yosemite. 5 pitches of 5.11. First continuous free ascent by Kauk in June 1977.
1976 : Art Higbee, Jim Erickson, free climb the 25-pitch NW Face of Half Dome, Yosemite, at 5.12d (newer variations are 5.12a).  3 pitches of 5.12, 5 of 5.11.
1976 : Mick Fowler leads, after rehearsal, FFA of Linden, Curbar Edge, UK. E6 6b (5.12a X) 60 ft.
1976 : Ron Fawcett free soloed Slip 'n' Slide, at Crookrise, North Yorkshire, England, at E6 6a (5.11c X), was one of the hardest-ever free solos at the time.
1977 : Helmut Kiene, Reinhard Karl make the first ascent of a 10-pitch climb with off-width crux, Pumpriße, Austria. Officially, the first UIAA Grade VII (5.10d/5.11a). Nuts for protection.
1977 : Ray Jardine leads the traditional climbing route The Phoenix, in Yosemite Valley, USA, first-ever ; uses his new SLCDs.
1977 : Lynn Hill leads the traditional climbing route Shawangunk Ridge, in the Shawangunk Mountains, USA, first-ever female .
1978 : Ron Kauk solves Midnight Lightning, in Camp 4, Yosemite, considered one of the first-ever  boulder problems.
1978 : John Gill solves The Groove, in Pueblo, Colorado, USA, considered the first-ever  boulder problem. 
1978 : Ray Jardine sells first  spring-loaded camming device ("cams" or "friends"), which he invented years earlier, making traditional climbing crack routes safer.
1978 : Dave Diegelman, Dale Bard, Jim Bridwell lead the aid climbing route Sea of Dreams on El Capitan, Yosemite, hardest-ever aid route at 5.9/A5 (27-pitches; 39 drilled holes).
1979 :  leads first free ascent of the traditional climbing route Grand Illusion, at Sugarloaf, Lake Tahoe, USA, first-ever .
1979 : Lynn Hill leads traditional climbing route Ophir Broke, in Telluride, USA, first-ever female .
1979 : Spanish manufacturer Boreal creates a "sticky rubber" board-lasted climbing shoe called Firé (Fee-ray), which materially increases performance on rock climbs.

1980s

1981 : John Bachar and Dave Yerian lead Bachar-Yerian, Medlicott Dome, Yosemite, a watershed US-multi-pitch route with some bolts at  R/X.
1983 : Ron Fawcett, leads the Master's Edge at Millstone Quarry, Peak District, England, a breakthrough traditional route at E7 6c (5.12c X).
1983 : Jerry Moffatt redpointed , in the Altmühltal, in the Frankenjura, Germany, Sax X-, first-ever .
1984 : Lynn Hill leads traditional climbing route, Vandals, in the Shawangunks, USA, first-ever female 
1984 : Wolfgang Güllich redpointed Kanal im Rücken, in Altmühl Valley Nature Park, Germany, Sax X, first-ever  and UIAA grade X. 
1985 : Spanish manufacturer Boreal makes a slip-lasted climbing shoe, the Boreal Ninja, which further increases performance; is the template for all future shoes.
1985 : Catherine Destivelle redpointed Fleur de Rocaille, at Mouriès, France, first-ever female ; initially thought to be the first-ever female 8a.
1985 : Wolfgang Güllich redpointed Punks in the Gym, at Mount Arapiles, Australia, Sax X+, first-ever .
1985 : July 5–7, Stefan Glowacz and Catherine Destivelle, win at Sportroccia, first-ever men's and women's International climbing competition, held in Bardonecchia, Italy.
1986 : Johnny Dawes leads Gaia at Black Rocks, End of the Affair at Curbar, and The Quarryman at Dinorwic, hardest traditional climbs at E8/9 6c/7a (in film Hard Grit).
1986 :  redpointed Comeback, at Valle San Nicolo, Italy, first-ever female .
1986 : October 4, Johnny Dawes leads the Indian Face, at Clogwyn Du'r Arddu, Wales, the hardest-ever traditional climbing route at E9 6c (5.13a X).
1986 : Jean-Baptiste Tribout redpointed To Bolt or Not to Be, at Smith Rock, Oregon, first-ever US ; bolted by Alan Watts, firmly establishes sport climbing in the US.
1986 :  redpointed La Rage de Vivre, at Buoux, France, the first-ever .
1987 : Wolfgang Güllich redpointed , in the Frankenjura, Germany, Sax XI-, first-ever .
1988 : Wolfgang Güllich invents the campus board to develop new training techniques called plyometrics, which would become standard for future extreme climbers.
1988 : Catherine Destivelle redpointed Chouca, at Buoux, France, first-ever female .
1988 : Isabelle Patissier redpointed Sortileges at Cimai crag, France, first-ever female .
 1988 : June 11–12, Patrick Edlinger and Catherine Destivelle, win at Snowbird, Utah, first-ever men's and women's International climbing competition to be held in the US.
1989 : (during the year), Simon Nadin and Nanette Raybaud, win the first annual UIAA Climbing World Cup, held over several legs during the year.

1990s

1990 : May, Jerry Moffatt redpointed Liquid Ambar, at Pen Trwyn in Wales, first-ever ; later considered the first-ever 8c+.
1990 : June 14, Ben Moon redpointed Hubble, at Raven Tor in the Peak District, England, first-ever ; possibly the first-ever 9a.
1990 : Lynn Hill redpointed Masse Critique, at Cimai crag, Aix-en-Provence, France, first-ever female .
1990 : October, Catherine Destivelle free soloed the Bonatti Pillar, on the Petit Dru, at TD+: 5.9 A1, hardest-ever female free solo of an Alpine big wall.
1991 : June, Catherine Destivelle free soloed the first free ascent (FFA) of Voie Destivelle on the west face of the Petit Dru, at VI 5.11b A5), is the hardest-ever female FFA of an Apline big wall, and the first-ever big wall route named after a female in the Alps.
1991 : September 14, Wolfgang Güllich redpointed Action Directe, in the Frankenjura, Germany, Sax XI, first-ever consensus .
1991 : October 1–2, François Legrand and Susi Good, win the first biennial UIAA Climbing World Championships, held in Frankfurt,  Germany.
1992 : John Middendorf and  climb The Grand Voyage, on Great Trango Tower, the world's hardest big wall climb at 5.10+, A4+, WI4.
1992 : Fred Nicole solves La Danse des Balrogs, at Branson, Valais, Switzerland, first-ever  boulder problem. 
1993 : Lynn Hill does the first free ascent (FFA) of the 3,000-foot Nose on El Capitan (5.14a/b); the biggest prize in big wall climbing, saying: "It goes, boys".
1995 : Alexander Huber, is the first person to free climb all pitches (single push, 1 hanging belay), of the Salathe Wall, El Capitan, Yosemite,  (35-pitches).
1996 :  solves Miss World, in Fontainebleau, France, first-ever female  boulder problem.
1996 : Ron Kauk, pinkpoints Magic Line, in Yosemite. One of the  hardest-ever traditional climbing routes at E10 (5.14b). 
1996 : January, Fred Nicole solves Radja, at Branson, Valais, Switzerland, first-ever  boulder problem. 
1996 : Alexander Huber redpointed , at the Schleierwasserfall in Austria, potentially the first-ever .
1997 :  solves Halloween, in Fontainebleau, France, first-ever female  boulder problem.
1998 : April, Josune Bereziartu redpointed Honky Tonky, at Onate, Spain, first-ever female  .
1998 : October,  solves Duel, in Fontainebleau, France, first-ever female  boulder problem. 
1999 : April,  solves Liaison Futile, in Fontainebleau, France, first-ever female  boulder problem.
1999 : June, Catherine Destivelle free soloed the Brandler-Hasse Route on the north face Cima Grande di Lavaredo, at ED-: 5.10c A0, first-ever female free solo.
1999 : (during the year), Christian Core and Stéphanie Bodet, win the first annual UIAA Bouldering World Cup, held over several legs during the year.

2000s

2000 : February 24, Neil Bentley led Equilibrium, in Burbage, Derbyshire, one of the world's hardest traditional climbing routes at E10 7a (5.14b X).
2000 : June, Josune Bereziartu redpointed Honky Tonk Mix, at Oñati, in Spain, first-ever female .
2001 : July 18, Chris Sharma redpointed Realization/Biographie, at Céüse, France, first-ever consensus . 
2002 : August, Fred Nicole solves Monkey Wedding and Black Eagle SDS, in Rocklands, South Africa, first-ever  boulder problems. 
2002 : October 29, Josune Bereziartu redpointed , at Saint-Loup, Switzerland, first-ever female .
2004 : Tommy Caldwell, leads the first free ascent of Dihedral Wall , El Capitan, Yosemite. 26 pitches total, 1 of 5.14 and 8 of 5.13.
2005 : May, Josune Bereziartu redpointed Bimbaluna, at Saint Loup, Switzerland, first-ever female . 
2006 : April, Dave MacLeod leads the first free ascent of Rhapsody , in Dumbarton Rock, U.K.; the first-ever traditional climbing route at E11 7a (5.14c); repeated by Jacopo Larcher in 2016.
2006 : April, Josune Bereziartu onsighted Hydrofobia, in the Montsant, Spain, first-ever female onsight at  
2007 : January, the UIAA separates out competition climbing into the newly formed International Federation of Sport Climbing (IFSC), led by the President of the UIAA Commission for Competition Climbing, Marco Maria Scolaris, with a goal to make competition climbing an Olympic sport; in December, the International Olympic Committee granted the IFSC provisional recognition.
2008 : September 11, Chris Sharma redpointed Jumbo Love, at Clark Mountain, California, first-ever .
2008 : Christian Core solves Gioia, in Varazze, Italy, first-ever  boulder problem. 
2008 : Tommy Caldwell and Justen Sjong lead the first free ascent of Magic Mushroom  on El Capitan. 28 pitches, 2 of 5.14a and 11 of 5.13.

2010s

2010 : August 17, Angie Payne solves The Automator, in RMNP, USA, first-ever female  boulder problem.
2012 : June 5–6, Alex Honnold, first to free solo (with some aid) the "Yosemite Triple Crown" (Mount Watkins South Face, The Nose on El Capitan, and the Half Dome North West Face) in 18 hours and 50 minutes.
2012 : October 4, Adam Ondra redpointed , in Flatanger, Norway, the first-ever  (possibly now 9b/9b+).
2012 : October 20, Tomoko Ogawa solves Catharsis, in Shiobara, Japan, first-ever female  boulder problem.
2013 : February 7, Adam Ondra redpointed La Dura Dura, in Oliana, Spain, the first confirmed  (repeated by Chris Sharma).
2016 : March 22, Ashima Shiraishi solves Horizon, at Mount Hiei, Japan, first-ever female  boulder problem.
2016 : August 3, the International Olympic Committee (IOC) announced that sport climbing would be a medal sport in the 2020 Summer Olympics.
2016 : September, Ethan Pringle leads Blackbeard's Tears in Redwood Coast, USA, the first-ever traditional climbing route at "hard" .
2016 : October, Nalle Hukkataival solves , in Lappnor, Finland, first-ever  boulder problem (unrepeated).
2017 : February 26, Margo Hayes redpointed La Rambla at the Spanish crag Siurana. First-ever female .
2017 : September 3, Adam Ondra redpointed Silence in Flatanger, Norway, first-ever proposed  (unrepeated).
2017 : October 22, Angela Eiter redpointed La Planta de Shiva in Villanueva del Rosario, Spain, first-ever female .
2019 : June, Janja Garnbret is the first competition climber to win every IFSC world cup event in a season during the 2019 IFSC bouldering world cup.

2020s

2021 : April, Daniel Woods solves Return of the Sleepwalker, in Red Rock Canyon, USA, second-ever  boulder problem (unrepeated).
2021 : August 3–6, Alberto Ginés López and Janja Garnbret win the first-ever mens's and women's Olympic climbing gold medals at the 2020 Tokyo Olympics in a combined event. 
2021 : September, Janja Garnbret becomes the most successful competition climber in history with 31 IFSC world cup golds, at the Kranj leg of the 2021 IFSC Climbing World Cup.
2022 : April 29, Sébastien Bouin redpointed  in the Verdon Gorge, France, second-ever proposed  (like Silence, remains unrepeated).

See also
List of first ascents
Notable first ascents (sport climbing)

Notes

References

External links
Rock climbing: from ancient practice to Olympic sport, Freddie Wilkinson, (National Geographic, March 2019)
Rock climbing - history & factfile, BBC (2022)

History
Rock climbing